Eric Jelen and Carl-Uwe Steeb were the defending champions, but Jelen did not participate this year.  Steeb partnered Patrik Kühnen, losing in the first round.

Marius Barnard and John-Laffnie de Jager won the title, defeating David Adams and Andrei Olhovskiy 6–4, 3–6, 7–6 in the final.

Seeds

Draw

Draw

External links
Draw

Kremlin Cup
Kremlin Cup